Hənifə is a village and municipality in the Balakan District of Azerbaijan. It has a population of 5,571. The municipality consists of the villages of Hənifə, Böyüktala, Məlikzadə, Cincartala, Gülüzənbinə, and Göyəmtala.

Notable natives 
 Ilham Mehdiyev - military officer, lieutenant general, the deputy head of the Azerbaijani State Border Service and Hero of the Patriotic War

References 

 

Populated places in Balakan District